Church of St. Theresa is a Roman Catholic church in Vilnius' Old Town, close to the Gate of Dawn. It was completed in 1650.

References

 

Roman Catholic churches completed in 1650
17th-century Roman Catholic church buildings in Lithuania
Baroque architecture in Lithuania
Church buildings with domes
Roman Catholic churches in Vilnius
1650 establishments in the Polish–Lithuanian Commonwealth